Abdulhamit Gül (born 12 March 1977) is a Turkish politician and former Minister of Justice. He is a member of the Grand National Assembly of Turkey from Gaziantep. He was previously the General Secretary of the Justice and Development Party. He is not related with Abdullah Gül.

Early life and education
Gül was born to working-class parents in Nizip  on 12 March 1977. His father is originally from Artvin. His mother was the daughter of an Islamic scholar born in Çermik and mentored by Said Nursî. She knew Kurdish. Gül attended a local high school, showing political interest from a young age. He completed his higher education at Ankara University.

Political career 
He was assigned as a member of board in Ankara Youth Community of Virtue Party (FP) and Welfare Party (RP). He was the head of the National Youth Foundation from 1999 to 2001. Between 2001 and 2003, he was the vice chairman of FP. From 2003 to 2010, he participated in the General Administration Board of FP as a member. From November 2010 to 22 September 2012, he served a member of the Founders' Board of People's Voice Party (HSP).

After the union of Justice and Development Party (AKP) and HSP, he was chosen as a member of the Official Decision and Administration Committee on 30 September 2012, at the 4th Ordinary Congress of AKP. In the general election of June 2015, he has been elected into the parliament as deputy of Gaziantep. He served as General Secretary of AKP from the meeting of Official Decision and Administration Committee at 13 September 2015 until being replaced by Fatih Şahin on 20 July 2017.

References

External links
Twitter page

1977 births
Living people
Ministers of Justice of Turkey
Justice and Development Party (Turkey) politicians
Members of the 26th Parliament of Turkey
People from Nizip
Ankara University alumni
People sanctioned under the Magnitsky Act
Members of the 66th government of Turkey